This article details the fixtures and results of the Azerbaijan national football team in 1990s (between 1992 and 1999).

1992–1999

1992

1993

1994

1995

1996

1997

1998

1999

References

1992
football team results
1993 in Azerbaijani sport
1994 in Azerbaijani sport
1995 in Azerbaijani sport
1996 in Azerbaijani sport
1997 in Azerbaijani sport
1998 in Azerbaijani sport
1999 in Azerbaijani sport
1 
1